Goliathus kolbei is one of the Goliath beetles, placed in the genus Goliathus, and the sole member of its own subgenus, Argyrophegges (sometimes misspelled as Argyropheges ), which has historically sometimes been treated as a separate genus.

References 

Cetoniinae
Beetles described in 1895